Mikhail Vladimirovich Artamonov (born 20 July 1997) is a Russian taekwondo athlete. He won a silver medal at the 2017 World Taekwondo Championships and a bronze at the 2020 Summer Olympics.

References

External links
 

Living people
1997 births
Russian male taekwondo practitioners
European Taekwondo Championships medalists
World Taekwondo Championships medalists
Taekwondo practitioners at the 2020 Summer Olympics
Medalists at the 2020 Summer Olympics
Olympic bronze medalists for the Russian Olympic Committee athletes
Lesgaft National State University of Physical Education, Sport and Health alumni
Olympic medalists in taekwondo
Olympic taekwondo practitioners of Russia
21st-century Russian people